Akania Nasirpur is a village in Chandpur District in the Chittagong Division of eastern Bangladesh. There is Akania Nasirpur High School in the village. It is located within Karaia union council in Kachua Upazila. Administratively, it is a mauza made up of two villages: Akania (population of 4,006) and Nasirpur (1,269).

References

Populated places in Chandpur District